Eréndira Cova Brindis  is a Mexican politician from the Institutional Revolutionary Party. From 2001 to 2003 she served as Deputy of the LVIII Legislature of the Mexican Congress representing Tlaxcala.

References

Date of birth missing (living people)
Living people
Politicians from Tlaxcala
Women members of the Chamber of Deputies (Mexico)
Institutional Revolutionary Party politicians
21st-century Mexican politicians
21st-century Mexican women politicians
Year of birth missing (living people)
Autonomous University of Tlaxcala alumni
Deputies of the LVIII Legislature of Mexico
Members of the Chamber of Deputies (Mexico) for Tlaxcala